Kristine Riis (born 3 August 1982) is a Norwegian actress and comedian. She is best known to international audiences for her role in the Netflix series Norsemen.

Career
Together with Live Nelvik and Siri Kristiansen, Riis hosted the show Drillpikene on NRK P3 from 2007 until 2009. She was also a guest host on the SNL-like show Torsdag kveld fra Nydalen and played the role of Benedicte in the series Nissene over skog og hei. In 2012, she joined the cast of Løvebakken. She became a permanent member of the series Underholdningsavdelingen on NRK1 in the spring of 2015.

In 2016, Riis was cast in the role of Liv, an opportunistic former slave who becomes the soon-to-be chieftain's wife, in the Netflix series Norsemen, a parody of Viking life and customs. She remained in the role for the duration of the show's three seasons, until March 2020.

From 2017 until 2018, Riis hosted the talk show Lørdagsrådet, which had previously been hosted by Siri Kristiansen (2010–17) and is currently presented by Live Nelvik.

Personal life
In 2017, Riis confirmed that she was dating comedian Jon Niklas Rønning. In May 2019, Riis gave birth to their child, a boy whom they have named Charlie Riis Rønning. The relationship ended in the autumn of 2019.

Selected filmography

References

External links

 

1982 births
Living people
Norwegian actresses
Norwegian women comedians
Norwegian radio presenters
Norwegian women radio presenters
Norwegian television presenters
Norwegian women television presenters